Alnage, or aulnage (from Old French aune, ell; parallel to "yardage") was the official supervision of the shape and quality of manufactured woolen cloth.

Origins

The alnage was first ordered in 1196, during the reign of Richard I, that "woollen cloths, wherever they are made, shall be of the same width, to wit, of two ells within the lists, and of the same goodness in the middle and sides." This ordinance is usually known as the Assize of Measures or the Assize of Cloth. Article 35 of Magna Carta re-enacted the Assize of Cloth, and in the reign of Edward I an official called an "alnager" or "aulnager" was appointed to enforce it. His duty was to measure each piece of cloth, and to affix a stamp to show that it was of the necessary size and quality. If faulty, the cloth was forfeit to the crown.

Later developments

As, however, the diversity of the wool and the importation of cloths of various sizes from abroad made it impossible to maintain any specific standard of width, the rules as to size were repealed in 1353. The increased growth of the woolen trade, and the introduction of new and lighter drapery in the reign of Elizabeth I, compelled a revision of the old standards. A statute was passed in 1665 creating the office of alnager of the new drapery, and defining the sizes to which cloth should be woven. The object of the statute was to prevent people being deceived by buying spurious woolen cloth, and to provide against fraud and imposition. Owing to the introduction of the alternative standard, a distinction arose between "broadcloth" (broadwoven cloth of two yards) and "streit" or "strait" (narrow cloth of one yard). The meaning now attached to broadcloth, however, is often merely that of material of specific type. Alnage duties and the office of alnager were abolished in 1699.

See also
Maltolt
Statute of the Staple
Weights and Measures Acts (UK) for quotes of relevant legislation

References 

 
Textiles
History of clothing